The City of Bradford Metropolitan District Council elections were held on Thursday, 5 May 1988, with one third of the council up for election as well as vacancies in Eccleshill & Wyke to be elected. Labour lost control of the council to no overall control following numerous losses to the Conservatives.

Election result

This result had the following consequences for the total number of seats on the council after the elections:

Ward results

References

1988 English local elections
1988
1980s in West Yorkshire